The 2010 AFC U-19 Championship was the 36th edition of the tournament organized by the Asian Football Confederation.

Qualification for the tournament started in October 2009 with the finals tournament being hosted in October 2010.

The AFC recommended China as the host for the 2010 AFC U-19 Championship Finals, which was subject to approval on 9 February 2010 and confirmed the hosting right's and finals venue of Zibo on 18 February 2010. The top four teams qualified for the 2011 FIFA U-20 World Cup.

Host cities and venues

Qualification Competition

Qualifiers

Draw
The draw for the AFC U-19 Championship 2010 was held on 9 May 2010 in Zibo, China.

Squads

Group stage
All times are China Standard Time (CST) - UTC+08:00.

Group A

Group B

Group C

Group D

Knockout stages
All times are China Standard Time (CST) - UTC+08:00.

Knockout Map

Quarter-finals

Semi-finals

Final

Winners

Awards

Goalscorers
7 goals
 Kerem Bulut
6 goals
 Ahmed Khalil
5 goals
 Jong Il-gwan
4 goals
 Hiroshi Ibusuki
3 goals

 Takashi Usami
 Pak Song-Chol

2 goals

 Matthew Fletcher
 Mustafa Amini
 Jin Jingdao
 Wu Lei
 Kaveh Rezaei
 Ryo Nagai
 Ji Dong-won
 Jung Seung-yong

1 goal

 Mathew Leckie
 Kofi Danning
 Dylan McGowan
 Terry Antonis
 Saad Al Amer
 Tan Tiancheng
 Zhu Jianrong
 Ali Abas
 Mitsunari Musaka
 Mahmoud Za'tara
 Jang Kuk-chol
 Jang Song-hyok
 Ri Hyong-jin
 Ri Hyok-chol
 Mohammed Majrashi
 Yahya Dagriri
 Yasser Al-Fahmi
 Abdullah Otayf
 Fahad Al-Johani
 Hwang Do-yeon
 Kim Kyung-jung
 Radwan Kalaji
 Sokjono Pattana
 Temurkhuja Abdukholiqov
 Omar Abdulrahman
 Abdumutallib Abdullayev
 Akram Bahritdinov
 Sardor Mirzaev
 Pavel Smolyachenko
 Lê Quốc Phương
 Ahmed Al-Baidhani

1 own goal

 Ali Bahjat (playing against Bahrain)
 Abdel-Aziz Saraweh (playing against Vietnam)
 Adan Rashid (playing against Japan)

Countries to participate in 2011 FIFA U-20 World Cup
Top-4 team qualified for 2011 FIFA U-20 World Cup.

References

External links
"AFC U-19 Championship schedule". The-AFC.com. 15 July 2010.

 
AFC U-19 Championship
U-19 Championship
International association football competitions hosted by China
2010 in Chinese football
2010 in youth association football